The Guangxi Massacre, or Guangxi Cultural Revolution Massacre, was a series of events involving lynching and direct massacre in Guangxi during the Cultural Revolution (1966–1976). The official record shows an estimated death toll from 100,000 to 150,000. Methods of slaughter included beheading, beating, live burial, stoning, drowning, boiling and disemboweling. In certain areas including Wuxuan County and Wuming District, massive human cannibalism occurred even though no famine existed. According to public records available, at least 137 people—perhaps hundreds more—were eaten by others and at least thousands of people participated in the cannibalism. Other researchers have pointed out that 421 victims who could be identified by name were eaten, and there were reports of cannibalism across dozens of counties in Guangxi.

After the Cultural Revolution, people who were involved in the massacre or cannibalism received minor punishments during the "Boluan Fanzheng" period; in Wuxuan County where at least 38 people were eaten, fifteen participants were prosecuted, receiving up to 14 years in prison, while ninety-one members of the Chinese Communist Party (CCP) were expelled from the party and thirty-nine non-party officials were either demoted or had a salary cut. Although the cannibalism was sponsored by local offices of the Communist Party and militia, no direct evidence suggests that anyone in the national Communist Party leadership including Mao Zedong endorsed the cannibalism or even knew of it. However, some scholars have pointed out that Wuxuan County, through internal channels, had notified the central leadership about the cannibalism in 1968.

Historical background 

In May 1966, Mao Zedong launched the Cultural Revolution. Starting from March 1967, two factions gradually formed among troops and civilians in Guangxi: one faction (known as "the United Headquarters") unconditionally supported Wei Guoqing—then Chairman of Guangxi and a high-ranking CCP official—to direct the revolution in Guangxi, while the other faction (known as "4.22") opposed such unconditional support, asking Wei to do self-criticism first. Clashes such as "violent struggles" between the two factions along with massacres soon took place in rural regions of Guangxi.

Even though the "4.22 faction" received support from Premier Zhou Enlai in August 1967, it was at a disadvantage throughout Guangxi except in the city of Guilin. In February 1968, Guangzhou Military Region ordered the troops which supported "4.22 faction" to move away from the region; in April 1968, Huang Yongsheng, then head of Guangzhou Military Region, declared that the "4.22 faction" was a "reactionary organization" and started massive suppression (at the same time, the Guangdong Massacre also took place). Since the summer of 1968, the massacre had spread from rural regions to cities of Guangxi.

Methods of killing 
In the massacre, methods of slaughter included "beheading, beating, live burial, stoning, drowning, boiling, group slaughters, disemboweling, digging out hearts, livers, genitals, slicing off flesh, blowing up with dynamite, and more".

 In one case, according to official records, a person had dynamite bound to the back and was blown up into pieces by other people ("天女散花")—just for fun.
In another case of 1968, "a geography instructor named Wu Shufang was beaten to death by students at Wuxuan Middle School. Her body was carried to the flat stones of the Qian River where another teacher was forced at gunpoint to rip out the heart and liver. Back at the school the pupils barbecued and consumed the organs."

Death toll

First investigation group 
In April 1981, an investigation group of over 20 people was formed under the arrangement of the Central Commission for Discipline Inspection, the General Office of the Chinese Communist Party, the Organization Department of the Chinese Communist Party, the Ministry of Public Security, the Supreme People's Court, and the Supreme People's Procuratorate.

In June 1981, the investigation concluded that the death toll was over 100,000, while some officials and civilians claimed privately that the death toll was 150,000, 200,000 or even 500,000. In addition, Qiao Xiaoguang reported to the Central Commission for Discipline Inspection that the death toll was 70,400.

Second investigation group 
In March 1983, another investigation group of 40 people was formed by the Central Committee of the Chinese Communist Party.

In January 1984, the investigation concluded that 89,700 deaths could be identified by names and addresses, over 20,000 people were missing, and over 30,000 deaths could not be identified by names or addresses. In particular, due to the violent struggles between the two opposing factions, 3,700 people died during direct fighting, 7,000 were persecuted to death, while 79,000 were beaten or shot to death in a planned and systematic matter. In Nanning, the capital of Guangxi, eight out of fourteen counties saw a death toll of over 1,000, with Binyang County alone losing 3,777 people.

Academic studies 
In 2006, Su Yang of University of California, Irvine argued that the Guangxi massacre was the most serious massacre during the Chinese Cultural Revolution. He stated that among the 65 accessible official county documents of Guangxi, 43 counties report local massacres with 15 of them recording a death toll of over 1000, while the average death toll was 526 among all the counties which reported massacre. Moreover, Song Yongyi pointed out that there were many differences between published official data and classified official data. For example, the published county annals of Lingshan County shows only eight people died, but in its classified document there were 3,220 victims; for another example, the published document from Binyang County shows 37 victims only, compared to 3,951 victims in its classified document. 

In his book Massacres during the Cultural Revolution (《文革大屠杀》), Song argued that most Cultural Revolution massacres were the action of "state apparatuses", or the direct slaughter by the regime towards its citizens. On the other hand, in his award-winning book Collective Killings in Rural China during the Cultural Revolution, Su proposed the "community model" to explain the massacre in Guangxi, challenging the prevailing models of genocide and mass killings.

Massive cannibalism

Official investigation 

Human cannibalism occurred in Guangxi during the Cultural Revolution. According to Zheng Yi, a scholar who conducted detailed research on the topic in the late 1980s and later smuggled some copies of official documents to the United States, at least 137 people—perhaps hundreds more—were eaten by others and thousands of people participated in the cannibalism. Documents also record a variety of forms of cannibalism, including eating people as an after-dinner snack, slicing off the meat in big parties, dividing up the flesh so each person could take a large chunk home, barbecuing or roasting the liver, and so on.

According to Yan Lebin, a member of the Ministry of Public Security who joined both of the investigation groups:In 1968, 38 people in Wuxuan County were eaten, and 113 officials of the county participated in eating human flesh, hearts and livers. Chen Guorong, a peasant from Guigang County who happened to pass by Wuxuan, was caught and killed by local militia because he was fat; his heart and liver were taken out while his flesh was distributed to 20 people. A female militia leader ate 6 human livers in total, and cut the genitals of 5 men and soaked them in alcohol which she would drink later, claiming that these organs were beneficial to her health. The behavior of eating human flesh, hearts and livers occurred in many counties of Guangxi including Wuxuan, Wuming, Shangsi, Guigang, Qinzhou, Guiping, and Lingyun... After the revolutionary committee was established in Shangsi County, a "killing conference" was held at Pingshan Square on September 1, 1968, during which more than 10 officials and civilians were beaten to death. After the conference, a committee member, Li Hao, removed the hearts and livers from the corpses, sauteing them and preparing them as dishes for other representatives who attended the conference.

Academic studies 

According to Song Yongyi, a Chinese historian who works at the California State University, Los Angeles:Independent researchers in Guangxi counted a total of 421 people who were eaten. There were reports of cannibalism across 27 counties in Guangxi; that's two-thirds of all the counties in Guangxi. There was one man who was said to be in the so-called fifth category, who was beaten to death where he stood. He had two kids, one of 11 and one of 14. The local officials and armed militia said that it was important to eradicate such people, and so they not only killed those two children: they ate them too. This took place in Pubei county, Guangxi, where 35 people were killed and eaten in total. Most of them were rich landowners and their families. There was one landowner called Liu Zhengjian whose entire family was wiped out. He had a 17-year-old daughter, Liu Xiulan, who was gang-raped by nine people [for 19 times] who then ripped open her belly, and ate her liver and breasts. There were so many incidents like this.

According to Frank Dikötter, Chair Professor of Humanities at the University of Hong Kong, Senior Fellow at Hoover Institution of Stanford, and winner of the 2011 Samuel Johnson Prize:Throughout 1967 but also '68, there are factions in the countryside that start not just eliminating each other physically, but literally in a couple of small towns they start ritualistically eating each other. In other words, it is not enough to eliminate your class enemy. You have to eat his heart, so there are very well-documented cases of ritual cannibalism. There was a hierarchy in the consumption of class enemies. Leaders feasted on the heart and liver, mixed with pork, while ordinary villagers were allowed only to peck at the victims' arms and thighs.Regarding the motive for cannibalism, Ding Xueliang (丁学良), a professor at the University of British Columbia and the Hong Kong University of Science and Technology, pointed out that "this was not cannibalism because of economic difficulties, like during famine. It was not caused by economic reasons, it was caused by political events, political hatred, political ideologies, political rituals." Qin Hui also showed with statistics that the cannibalism was not due to the traditions of local ethnic minorities; he argued that the cannibalism was mainly due to: 1) the extreme class struggle during the Cultural Revolution, which led to a modern "caste" system (such as the Five Black Categories) and an extreme massacre towards the lower class from the upper class; 2) the revenge from the local officials and military towards the rebel group who challenged their interests. On the other hand, according Song Yongyi, the motive behind cannibalism was personal desire. Song stated that these people engaged in cannibalistic activities because they "believe that when they eat other people's livers, other people's hearts, it will help them to have a long life". While some research indicates that it was communism that compelled the perpetrators in this area towards cannibalism, on the other hand, Roderick MacFarquhar and Michael Schoenhals disputed that communism was to be blamed for this incident, noting that similar incidents occurred under pressure from the Kuomintang secret police in the republican period.

Public responses

Witnesses and investigators

In 2016, Agence France-Presse (AFP) interviewed a local man with last name Luo who responded, "Cannibalism? I was here then, I went through it. But Wuxuan has developed rapidly in recent years and now. That history 'has no meaning'."
In 2016, a high-ranking member of an early 1980s official investigation told AFP that "[a]ll the cannibalism was due to class struggle being whipped up and was used to express a kind of hatred. The murder was ghastly, worse than beasts."
In 2013, Yang Liping, a notable Chinese dancer, claimed that she had seen cannibalism during the Cultural Revolution, although not necessarily in Guangxi. She stated that "I am pessimistic about humanity and pessimistic about humans. Because we have been through the Cultural Revolution, we have become very alert. I am very alert, alert like a peacock. Be careful, because humans are the most horrible animals, otherwise Michael Jackson wouldn't have died... I saw people eat people, and people hurt people, just like nowadays. Nowadays people can hurt you anytime, yet they don't even know why they hurt you."
In 1995, Donald S. Sutton, a professor at Carnegie Mellon University, wrote in his research paper, "Did cannibalism actually take place in Wuxuan?... That the incident truly occurred was independently confirmed by a recent visitor to Wuxuan, the scholar and journalist, John Gittings. An off-duty local clerk spoke airily of the killings and the cannibalism—obligingly writing down his name and address when asked—and added with a touch of pride, "In Wuxuan... we ate more people than anywhere else in China" (The Guardian, November 27, 1993)."

Researchers 

 In 2013, Qin Hui, a professor at Tsinghua University, discussed the contributions of Deng Xiaoping with Ezra Vogel, a professor with Harvard University, when Qin said "my hometown is in Guangxi, where people were killed in massacres during Mao's era, and some of them were eaten by others! In the bloody summer of 1968, people in Hong Kong and Macau all knew that there were corpses floating down from Xi River to Pearl River."
 In 2001, Perry Link, a professor of Chinese at Princeton University, stated that "I believe Zheng's story [of cannibalism]. He's a writer of integrity, and the rich detail has the ring of authenticity."
 In 1999, sinologist Gang Yue questioned how "systematic" the cannibalism could have been, given the inherent factionalism of the Cultural Revolution.
In 1997, Key Ray Chong, a professor of history at Texas Tech University, wrote in his review of Zheng Yi's book of cannibalism that "[d]uring the Cultural Revolution, quite a few Chinese officials knew of this horror, the equivalent of the Nazi Holocaust in the 1940s and the killing fields of Pol Pot in the 1970s. But they remained silent about the subject."

Media 

In 2016, The Irish Times stated in its review of Cultural Revolution that "[t]errible stories abounded. There were tales of cannibalism in Guangxi province where 'bad elements' were publicly butchered and more than 70 victims were eaten in Wuxuan."
In 2016, The Guardian stated in its review of Cultural Revolution that "[p]erhaps the worst affected region was the southern province of Guangxi where there were reports of mass killings and even cannibalism."
In 2013, Renmin Wang, the official media of the Chinese Communist Party, as well as some other Chinese media reprinted an article from China Youth Daily, which stated that during the Cultural Revolution "in some places such as Guangxi, the hearts and livers of people were eaten after they were beaten to death, and, surprisingly, such cannibalism was prevalent in that region!" The article further stated, "throughout the human history of the 20th century, was there any country that had experienced the Cultural Revolution like ours? The only comparable time was Nazi Germany. However, up to this date, we do not even have a decent review or reflection on this period of history... A society that does not reflect on the Cultural Revolution is perhaps still a tribe of cannibalism. Such tribe, no matter how beautiful people look on the outside and how modernized the fruits of civilization are used (in society), is still a tribe of cannibalism without humanity."
In 2001, Time stated that "Mao Zedong's Cultural Revolution was an eruption of ideological fervor, mass hysteria and outright brutality that left an estimated 10 million Chinese dead and ruined the lives of millions more. Now tales of even more horrible excesses from the years between 1966 and 1976 are coming to light: allegations of cannibalism, involving hundreds of men and women who violated mankind's most powerful taboo in the name of revolutionary purity."
In 1996, The Washington Post stated, after Zheng Yi published his book that "[t]he party wants to block any deep-going analysis of the role played by the late Chairman Mao Zedong and numerous party members. Full disclosure of the truth might destroy what little legitimacy the party still clings to."
In 1993, Newsweek stated that "[t]he accounts were harrowing. Principals killed in schoolyards by students, then cooked and eaten. Government-run cafeterias displaying human bodies hanging from meat hooks and dishing them out to employees... Documents smuggled out of China last week described atrocities of the Cultural Revolution in grotesque detail."
In 1993, The New York Times stated that "[t]he incidents reported from Guangxi were apparently the most extensive episodes of cannibalism in the world in the last century or more. They were also different from any others in that those who took part were not motivated by hunger or psychopathic illness. Instead, the actions appeared to be ideological: the cannibalism, which the documents say took place in public, was often organized by local Communist Party officials, and people apparently took part together to prove their revolutionary ardor."

See also 

Guangdong Massacre
Violent Struggle
Boluan Fanzheng
Reforms and Opening-up
Mass killings under communist regimes
List of massacres in China
Cannibalism in China
Scarlet Memorial: Tales of Cannibalism in Modern China

References

Further reading 

Frank Dikötter. The Cultural Revolution: A People’s History, 1962–1976. Bloomsbury Publishing, 2016. .
Song Yongyi. Chronology of Mass Killings during the Chinese Cultural Revolution (1966–1976). Online Encyclopedia of Mass Violence, 25 August 2011. .
Joseph W. Esherick (Editor), Paul G. Pickowicz (Editor), and Andrew G. Walder (Editor). The Chinese Cultural Revolution as History. Stanford University Press, 2006. .
Zheng Yi. Scarlet Memorial: Tales of Cannibalism in Modern China. Edited and translated by T. P. Sym. Perseus Books Group, 1998. .
Key Ray Chong. Scarlet Memorial: Tales of Cannibalism in Modern China (review). China Review International, Vol. 4, No. 2, Fall 1997. pp. 599–602
Donald S. Sutton. Consuming Counterrevolution: The Ritual and Culture of Cannibalism in Wuxuan, Guangxi, China, May to July 1968. Comparative Studies in Society and History, Vol. 37, No. 1 (Jan., 1995), pp. 136–172.
John Gittings. The truth behind the fiction. Index on Censorship, Vol. 23, 1994. pp. 204–205.

Massacres in the 1960s
Massacres in the 1970s
Cultural Revolution
Massacres in China
Man-made disasters in China
History of Guangxi
Incidents of cannibalism
Cannibalism in Asia
Massacres committed by the People's Republic of China
1970s murders in China
1960s murders in China 
1976 murders in China
1967 murders in China